Trouble may refer to:

Film and television
 Trouble (1922 film), an American silent comedy-drama film directed by Albert Austin
 Trouble (1933 film), a British comedy film
 Trouble (1977 film), a Soviet drama film
 Trouble (2017 film), an American comedy-drama film
 Trouble (2019 film), аn American computer-animated family comedy film
 Trouble (TV channel), a television station in the UK and Republic of Ireland

Music
 Trouble (band), an American doom metal band

Albums
 Trouble (Akon album), 2004
 Trouble (Bonnie McKee album) or the title song, 2004
 Trouble (EXID album) or the title song, 2019
 Trouble (Matt Terry album) or the title song, 2017
 Trouble (Michael Sterling album) or the title song, 1991
 Trouble (Natalia Kills album) or the title song (see below), 2013
 Trouble (Ray LaMontagne album) or the title song (see below), 2004
 Trouble (Randy Rogers Band album), 2013
 Trouble (Sailor album), 1975
 Trouble (Totally Enormous Extinct Dinosaurs album) or the title song, 2012
 Trouble (Trouble album), 1990
 Trouble (Whitesnake album) or the title song, 1978
 Trouble: The Jamie Saft Trio Plays Bob Dylan, 2006
 T-R-O-U-B-L-E (album), by Travis Tritt, 1992
 Trouble (EP), by Ayumi Hamasaki, 2018
 Trouble, a 2007 album by Trampled by Turtles

Songs
 "Trouble" (American Authors song), 2014
 "Trouble" (Bei Maejor song), 2011
 "Trouble" (Cage the Elephant song), 2016
 "Trouble" (Cat Stevens song), 1970
 "Trouble" (Chris Rene song), 2012
 "Trouble" (Coldplay song), 2000
 "Trouble" (Cypress Hill song), 2001
 "Trouble" (Elvis Presley song), 1958; covered by several artists (for the 1975 song, see below)
 "Trouble" (Gloriana song), 2014
 "Trouble" (Heaven 17 song), 1987
 "Trouble" (Iggy Azalea song), 2015
 "Trouble" (Keith Richards song), 2015
 "Trouble" (Leona Lewis song), 2012
 "Trouble" (Lindsey Buckingham song), 1981
 "Trouble" (Natalia Kills song), 2013
 "Trouble" (Neon Jungle song), 2013
 "Trouble" (Nia Peeples song), 1988
 "Trouble" (Pink song), 2003
 "Trouble" (Ray LaMontagne song), 2005
 "Trouble" (Shampoo song), 1994
 "Trouble" (Todd Snider song), 1995
 "Trouble" (Vassy song), 2019
 "T-R-O-U-B-L-E" (song), by Elvis Presley, 1975; covered by Travis Tritt, 1992
 "Ya Got Trouble", often credited as "Trouble", from the musical The Music Man, 1957
 "Trouble", by Ab-Soul featuring Aloe Blacc from Welcome to Los Santos, 2015
 "Trouble", by Bitter:Sweet from Drama, 2008
 "Trouble", by the Blizzards from A Public Display of Affection, 2006
 "Trouble", by Bob Dylan from Shot of Love, 1981
 "Trouble", by Britney Spears from Circus, 2008
 "Trouble", by Da Baby from Blame It on Baby, 2020
 "Trouble", by Destry from It Goes On, 2009
 "Trouble", by Exo from Obsession, 2019
 "Trouble", by Five Finger Death Punch from A Decade of Destruction, 2017
 "Trouble", by Frankie Miller from High Life, 1974
 "Trouble", by Freddie Jackson from Time for Love, 1992
 "Trouble", by Ginuwine from A Man's Thoughts, 2009
 "Trouble", by J. Cole from Born Sinner, 2013
 "Trouble", by Jay-Z from Kingdom Come, 2006
 "Trouble", by John Farnham from Whispering Jack, 1986
 "Trouble", by Josh Ross, 2023
 "Trouble", by Kano from Hoodies All Summer, 2019
 "Trouble", by the Kingsmen from Up and Away, 1966
 "Trouble", by the Knocks from Testify, 2017
 "Trouble", by Liam Payne from LP1, 2019
 "Trouble", by Little Feat from Sailin' Shoes, 1972
 "Trouble", by Lizz Wright from Dreaming Wide Awake, 2005
 "Trouble", by Lost Frequencies, 2014
 "Trouble", by Mabel from High Expectations, 2019
 "Trouble", by Mark Chesnutt from Wings, 1995
 "Trouble", by Metronomy from The English Riviera, 2011
 "Trouble", by Quiet Riot from Quiet Riot II, 1978
 "Trouble", by Rudimental and Sub Focus, 2017
 "Trouble", by Ryan Adams from Ryan Adams, 2014
 "Trouble", by Skindred from Roots Rock Riot, 2007
 "Trouble", by Sleeping with Sirens from Gossip, 2017
 "Trouble", by TooManyLeftHands, 2014
 "Trouble", by TV on the Radio from Seeds, 2014
 "Trouble", by Whitesnake from Whitesnake, 1987
 "Trouble", by Willam Belli from The Wreckoning, 2012

People
 Trouble (rapper) (1987–2022), American rapper
 Trouble T Roy (1967–1990), American hip-hop dancer with Heavy D and the Boyz
 Bruno Troublé (born 1945), French sailor in the 1968 and 1976 Olympics
 Keef Trouble (born 1949), English composer, singer and musician
 MC Trouble (1970–1991), first female rapper signed to Motown Records
 Melody "Trouble" Vixen, professional wrestler from the Gorgeous Ladies of Wrestling

Other uses
 Trouble (board game), in which players race four pieces around a board
 Trouble (comics), a 2003 Marvel limited series
 Trouble (magazine), an Australian online monthly promoting visual and performing arts and culture
 Trouble (novel), a 2009 novel by Kate Christensen
 Trouble, a dog who inherited a $12 million trust from Leona Helmsley

See also
 
 
 Deep Trouble (disambiguation)
 Double Trouble (disambiguation)
 Troubles (disambiguation)